Anne Randall (born Barbara Burrus; September 23, 1944) is an American model and actress. She was Playboy magazine's Playmate of the Month for its May 1967 issue. Her centerfold was photographed by Mario Casilli.

Career
In 1959, Barbara became a regular on the KPIX Dance Party, an afternoon television show featuring teenagers dancing to popular music, broadcast on KPIX-TV Channel 5 (CBS)  in San Francisco. It was hosted by Dick Stewart  and aired from 1959 to 1963.

During the late 1960s and throughout the 1970s, Anne pursued a film and television career, appearing in such shows as Cannon, Barnaby Jones, and The Rockford Files.  She also spent two years as one of the beauties on Hee Haw.

In 1967, she married Dick Stewart, and is sometimes credited as Anne Randall Stewart.

Film and television work 
 J-Men Forever (1979) (voice) (as Anne Randall Stewart)
 Switch - "Net Loss" (1977) TV Episode (as Anne Randall Stewart) .... Lena Ionescu
 Roger & Harry: The Mitera Target (1977) (TV) (as Anne Randall Stewart) .... Joanna March
 The Rockford Files - "The Trouble with Warren" (1976) .... Catherine Lefcourt
 Bronk - "Jailbreak" (1976) TV Episode (as Anne Randall Stewart)
 Hot L Baltimore - "Ainsley's Secret" (1975) TV Episode
 Barnaby Jones
 "Forfeit by Death" (1974) .... Peggy Gibson
 "To Catch a Dead Man" (1973) .... Billie Thompson
 Love, American Style
 "Love and the Competitors/Love and the Forever Tree/Love and the Image Makers/Love and Mr. Bunny/Love and the Phobia" (1974) .... (segment "Love and the Image Makers")
 "Love and the Caller/Love and the Secret Life/Love and the Swinging Philosophy/Love and the Woman in White" (1972) .... (segment "Love and the Caller")
 Cannon - "Trial by Terror" (1973) TV Episode
 Westworld (1973) .... Daphne, Servant Girl
 Stacey (1973) .... Stacey Hanson
 The Night Strangler (1973) (TV) (uncredited) .... Policewoman Sheila
 The Doris Day Show - "The Music Man" (1972) (TV)
 Hee Haw (1969) .... Herself (1972–1973)
 The Streets of San Francisco - "Tower Beyond Tragedy" (1972) .... Robin Short
 Get to Know Your Rabbit (1972) .... Stewardess
 Cade's County - "The Fake" (1972) .... Carla Ardmore
 Doomsday Voyage (1972) .... Katherine Jason
 Days of Our Lives (1965) .... Sheila Hammond #2 (1971–1972)
 Night Gallery - "Tell David"... (1971) .... Julie
 The Christian Licorice Store (1971) .... Texas Girl
 McCloud - "Somebody's Out to Get Jennie" (1971) .... Beverly
 Banyon (1971) (TV) .... Linda Hayden
 The Mod Squad - "The King of Empty Cups" (1970)
 Hell's Bloody Devils (1970) .... Amanda
 Model Shop (1969) .... Model No. 2
 A Time for Dying (1969) .... Nellie Winters
 The Split (1968) (uncredited) .... Negli's Girl
 The Monkees - "Everywhere a Shiek, Shiek" (1967) .... Maiden #2

See also
 List of people in Playboy 1960–1969

References

External links 
 
 

1944 births
Living people
People from Alameda, California
1960s Playboy Playmates